Nepali/Nepalese cuisine refers to the food eaten in Nepal. The country's cultural and geographic diversity provides ample space for a variety of cuisines based on ethnicity and on soil and climate. Nevertheless, dal-bhat-tarkari is eaten throughout the country. Dal is a soup made of lentils and spices. This is served over boiled grain, bhat—usually rice with vegetable stew, tarkari. Condiments are usually small amounts of extremely spicy chutney (चटनी) or pickle (achaar, अचार) which can be fresh or fermented.  The variety of these is staggering, said to number in the thousands. Other accompaniments may be sliced lemon (kagati) with fresh green chili (hariyo khursani). Dhindo is a traditional food of Nepal. It also has a high influence of west and central Asian cuisine.

Nepali/Nepalese dishes

 Aato (made from crushed corn)
 Achaar
Anarsa - Sweet rice fried cookie
Alu chop - deep fried smashed potato
 Chiura (flattened rice)
Bambaisan - dessert / sweet made out of milk in Ilam district
 Bara 
Batuk - Fried black lentil doughnut
 Bhatmaas – Nepali name for fried black soybeans
 Buffalo curd – curd dairy product prepared from buffalo milk
 Bhakka
Bhatmas sadheko - snacks / salsa made from soybean
Bhogate sadheko - Pomelo salad
Bhuja or murai - Puffed rice
 Bagiya - (made of rice flour with different kind of salty or sweet fillings cooked boiling water)
 Bhuswa - a spherical-shape sweet flour laddoo made during chhath festival in terai region
 Bhuteko Makkai and Bhatmaas
Bigauti - sweet made out from cow's colostrum milk
Bunga ko achar - Salad made from banana flower
 Chauka - flax seed curry 
 Chaat
 Chaku (Nepalese cuisine)
Chamre
 Chatamari
Chatpate
 Chhurpi
 Chicken curry
 Choila
Choop (छोप) (Til / Silam / Alas / Filunge / Timmur) - Powdered condiments(Sesame / Perilla / Flaxseed / Niger seeds/Nepali Pepper)
 Chow mein
chuuk - thickned lemon / lime juice by cooking
 Chukauni - Yoghurt and Potato
 Chunlā
 Chutney
 Curry
 Dal
 Dal bhat
 Dhindo
 Dhikri
 Dhakane
 Daal puri - a traditional snacks in terai region like paratha, made of rice and wheat flour filled with gram pulses.
 Fini roti
 Fried cauliflower
Fulaura - Fried black lentil balls
Furandana
 Ghiu / Ghee
 Ghonghi  
Gilo roti
Gundruk
 Haluwa
 Jaaulo
Jerry Swari
Kassar -laddu / sweet made from rice flour
Khalpi - ripened / matured cucumber pickle (fermented)
Khatte (roasted rice)
Khajuri - oil fried cookies
 Kheer
 Khichdi
 Khoa (Kurauni)
 Kinema
 Kodo ko roti
 Kwati
 Khajuriya - like a cookie, dough is fried in oils made during chhath festival in terai region.
 Lai - sesame seeds or puffed rice mixed with jaggery syrup and shaped as spherical small balls mainly celebrated on maghe sankranti festival (during February).
 Laping
 Makai ko roti
 Masyaura
 Momo (dumpling)
 Mula ko Achar (Fermented)
 Noodle soup
 Phapar ko Roti
 Pokhemma
 Press cake
 Pukala
 Pustakari
Puwa / chamal ko puwa - made from coarsely grinded rice
 Qeema
 Raita
Rikikur - Sherpa potato pancake
Rildhuk / Rildok - mashed and pounded potato Sherpa soup
 Roti
 Saag (Rayo, Mula, Farsi, Tori, Sisnu, Sim)
 Saatu
 Samay Baji
 Sapu Mhicha
 Sekuwa
 Sel roti
Sidra - small dried fish
Sikarni - Dessert made from strained yoghurt, fruits and dried nuts
 Sinki (food)
Sittan - snacks accompanying alcoholic drinks
 Sukkha Roti (Tortilla)
 Sukuti
 Swan Puka
 Tama - bamboo shoots 
 Taas
 Tarasari
 Taruwa - made of vegetables dipped in a gram flour batter and fried.
 Thali
 Thukpa
 Thakuwa - like cookies made during chhath festival in terai region.
 Wachipa

Curries

 Aloo kauli
 Kukhurako masu – Chicken spiced stew
 goat stew
 Gundruk
Tama
 Vegetable tarkari
 Pork stew
 Mixed Veg Tarkari
 Masyaura
 Dal
 Saag
Aloo Tama
Gundruk ko Jhol
Aloo Kerau

Newa cuisine

 Aalu achar
 Bodi ko Achar
 Chataamari
 Dhau
Gwaramari
 Kachilaa
 Lakhamari
 Sanyaa
 Sanyaakhunya
 Thwon
 Yomari
 Alu tama
 Choila
 Pau kwa
 Sapu Mhicha

Rajbanshi cuisine
 Bhakkha 
 Pitha Bhaja

Tharu cuisine 

 Ghonghi
 Dhikri
 Bagiya
 Bhakkha

Beverages 

 Aila (liquor)
 Butter tea
 Chhaang
 Chiya
Masala chiya/chai
 Mohi - buttermilk
 Nepali tea/Nepali Chiya – a beverage from the leaves of tea plants produced in Nepal
 Raksi {Senteyrem (in Kalimpong)}
 Rakura chiya/tea
 Tongba
 Khukuri/Khukri Rum
 Nigar
 Sharbat

See also
 Cinnamomum tamala

References

External links
 

Lists of foods by nationality
Dishes